The 2015–16 UC Irvine Anteaters men's basketball team represented the University of California, Irvine during the 2015–16 NCAA Division I men's basketball season. The Anteaters were led by sixth year head coach Russell Turner and played their home games at the Bren Events Center. They are members of the Big West Conference. They finished the season 28–10, 13–3 in Big West play to win a share of the regular season Big West championship. They defeated Cal Poly in the quarterfinals of the Big West tournament to advance to the semifinals where they lost to Long Beach State. They were invited to the CollegeInsider.com Tournament where they defeated North Dakota, Louisiana–Lafayette, and Coastal Carolina to advance to the championship game where they lost to Columbia. This season, UC Irvine set the new season record in wins with 28, surpassing the previous mark of 25. They also set the records for most true road wins with 13, and most conference wins with 13. Alex Young became the first player in school history to record career 1,000 points, 500 assists, and 500 rebounds. Mamadou N'Diaye broke the school record in career blocked shots with 218.

Off-Season

2015 Recruiting Class

Roster

Schedule
Sources:

|-
!colspan=9 style="background:#002244; color:#FFDE6C;"|  Exhibition

|-
!colspan=9 style="background:#002244; color:#FFDE6C;"| Non-conference regular season

|-
!colspan=9 style="background:#002244; color:#FFDE6C;"| Big West regular season

|-
!colspan=9 style="background:#002244; color:#FFDE6C;"| Big West tournament

|-
!colspan=9 style="background:#002244; color:#FFDE6C;"| CIT

References

UC Irvine
UC Irvine Anteaters men's basketball seasons
UC Irvine
UC Irvine Anteaters
UC Irvine Anteaters